Lili Caneças, the professional name of Maria Alice Custódio Carvalho Monteiro (born 4 April 1944) is a Portuguese socialite.

Biography
In her childhood, Caneças lived in Vila Franca de Xira and in Peniche, and then settled, in early adolescence, in Cascais. At that time this quiet fishing village welcomed several members of the exile European aristocracy, which had a great fascination for Caneças.

When she was only 16 years old, Caneças had her first appearance on television when she won a mask competition at Casino Estoril. She was interviewed for RTP by Henrique Mendes, who even said he was impressed by the physical appearance of the young woman.

At the age of 17, Caneças entered the course of German Philology, in Faculty of Letters of the University of Lisbon. However, she decided to leave the course in the third year, in order to become a TAP Air Portugal hostess. After a short time as hostess, she left the airline to marry, with a little more than 20 years, the construction entrepreneur and millionaire Alvaro Caneças. During the married period, she said, she lived a life surrounded by luxury, which allowed her to travel a little around the world and attend parties where she met countless personalities.

At age 37, however, the couple divorced and Caneças, without personal property, and with a daughter under her responsibility, lost the luxurious life to which she was accustomed. For some time, she remained financially supported by her ex-husband. At that time he moved from the mansion of Quinta da Marinha to an apartment in Gandarinha, belonging to the city of Cascais.

Known as the "aunt" of Cascais, when appearing as a commentator on the TV reality show, "SIC, in 2001, Lili Caneças became even more known to the general public. The program, which was a leader of audiences, was presented by Jorge Gabriel, and consisted of the constant monitoring of 12 candidates who tried to manage a bar in Lisbon. From that time, the plastic operations which Caneças underwent also aroused a great attention on the part of the social press.

Then, in 2005, Caneças participated in another "reality show", this time in TVI, the Quinta das Celebrities. The same station would hire her as a commentator on the show "Você na TV!", Presented by Manuel Luís Goucha and Cristina Ferreira, sharing with Cinha Jardim and Flávio Furtado "They say It and He". At the end of a year, in 2009, she left along with Jardim.

In 2006, the authorized biography of Lili Caneças was released, written by Flávio Furtado, with the title Lili Caneças – Cinderela ao Contrário.

In 2008, Caneças was approached by the director Carlos Avilez to participate in the Tennessee Williams play, "Sweet Sweet of the Youth", thus realizing an experience as a theater actress, at age of 64.

In 2013, she revealed that she intended to move to the United States, which did not happen.

In 2014, she returned to the television, participating in the program "Sabadadabadão", presented by Júlia Pinheiro and João Baião.

In 2017, Caneças appears like star of a "video clip" that became popular, called  Calhambeque . The musical project is called "Dois Brancos & Um Preto", it is formed by three young "YouTubers" (Nurb, Conguito and Pakistan) and intends to offer the public "remasters" of songs that everyone knows, on a Trap-Pimba album.

References

External links

1944 births
Living people
People from Vila Franca de Xira
People from Guarda, Portugal
Portuguese socialites
20th-century Portuguese people
21st-century Portuguese people